Ptilocodiidae is a family of hydrozoans in the order Anthoathecata.

Genera
Hansiella Bouillon, 1980
Hydrichthella Stechow, 1909
Ptilocodium Coward, 1909
Thecocodium Bouillon, 1967
Tregoubovia Picard, 1958<ref name=V>Picard, J. (1958). Tregoubovia n. gen. atentaculata n. sp. Nouvelle Anthoméduse, dépourvue de tentacules récolté dans le plancton profond de Villefranche-sur-mer. Rapports et Procès-Verbaux des Réunions, Commission Internationale pour l'Exploration Scientifique de la Mer Méditerranée, 14, 185–186.</ref>Tregouboviopsis'' Wang, Du, Xu, Huang & Guo, 2017

References

Filifera
Cnidarian families